Denis Karyagin (born 28 September 2002) is a Bulgarian professional volleyball player. He is a member of the Bulgaria national team. At the professional club level, he plays for Spacer's de Toulouse.

Honours
 CEV Cup
  2021/2022 – with Vero Volley Monza

 National championships
 2018/2019  Bulgarian SuperCup, with Neftochimic Burgas
 2018/2019  Bulgarian Championship, with Neftochimic Burgas
 2020/2021  Bulgarian SuperCup, with Neftochimic Burgas
 2020/2021  Bulgarian Cup, with Neftochimic Burgas

References

External links
 
 Player profile at LegaVolley.it 
 Player profile at Volleybox.net

2002 births
Living people
Sportspeople from Burgas
Bulgarian men's volleyball players
Bulgarian expatriate sportspeople in Italy
Expatriate volleyball players in Italy
Bulgarian expatriate sportspeople in Poland
Expatriate volleyball players in Poland
Bulgarian expatriate sportspeople in France
Expatriate volleyball players in France
ZAKSA Kędzierzyn-Koźle players
Outside hitters